Trichodirabius is a genus of flower weevils in the beetle family Curculionidae. There are at least four described species in Trichodirabius.

Species
These four species belong to the genus Trichodirabius:
 Trichodirabius canus (LeConte, 1876)
 Trichodirabius industus Casey
 Trichodirabius indutus Casey, 1920
 Trichodirabius longulus (LeConte, 1876)

References

Further reading

 
 
 

Baridinae
Articles created by Qbugbot